Lexi Vega, better known by her stage name Mini Trees, is an American indie rock musician based in Los Angeles. She has toured with Julien Baker as well as Tasha, Briston Maroney, Hovvdy, and Deep Sea Diver.

Career
Vega began making music as a career in 2018. Vega independently released her debut EP as Mini Trees in 2019 titled Steady Me. Vega independently released her second EP, Slip Away, in June of 2020. In April 2021, Vega signed with Boston based record label Run for Cover Records Two months later, Vega announced her debut full-length album, Always In Motion, due out on Run for Cover. The album was released on September 17, 2021.

Personal life
Vega was born in Southern California to a second generation Japanese-American mother and an immigrant father from Cuba. She was raised in the town of La Cañada and currently lives in Torrance. Vega's father passed away when she was five years old.<p>
Both of Vega's parents had worked in the music industry; her mother was a vocalist in Japanese pop jazz fusion group Hiroshima and her father worked as a professional drummer.

Discography
Studio albums
Always In Motion (2021, Run For Cover)
EPs
Steady Me (2019)
Slip Away (2020)

References

American indie rock musicians
American people of Japanese descent
American people of Cuban descent
Musicians from Los Angeles
Year of birth missing (living people)
Living people
Run for Cover Records artists